Impossible Object is a 1968 novel written by Nicholas Mosley. It was shortlisted for the Booker Prize in 1969.

Film adaptation
In 1973, a motion picture adaptation starring Alan Bates, and Dominique Sanda was released. The film was scripted by the novel's author, Nicholas Mosley.

References

1968 British novels
British novels adapted into films
Hodder & Stoughton books